Warloy-Baillon is a commune in the Somme department in Hauts-de-France in northern France.

Geography

Population

Places of interest
 The church of Saint-Pierre: The stone building was constructed on natural sandstone foundations.
 The war memorial.
 The military cemetery
 Memorial plaque to two Allied pilots that died over Warloy-Baillon during the Second World War: in 1940, Lucas in a Hurricane Mk1; and in 1944, Pinkney in an Auster.
 The tower of an old windmill, in need of restoration.

See also
Communes of the Somme department

References

Communes of Somme (department)